The Zurkaitzegiko erreka is a torrential river of the French Basque Country (Pyrénées-Atlantiques), in the Southwest of France, that flows below the village of Larrau.

After joining the Olhadoko erreka, from the Holtzarte Canyon, it forms the Gave de Larrau. Together with the Gave de Larrau, it is considered the upper course of the Saison by Sandre.

Tributaries: Nahar-ordokilako erreka, Gerrendoiko erreka, Harbeltzetako erreka, Odeizakiko erreka, Orpuneko erreka, Erroimendiko erreka, Larrandako erreka, Haritz handiko erreka, Sarrantolatzeko or Oronitzeko erreka…

References

Rivers of Pyrénées-Atlantiques
Rivers of France
Rivers of Nouvelle-Aquitaine